Charles G. Hutchinson invented and patented the Hutchinson Patent Stopper in 1879 as a replacement for cork bottle stoppers which were commonly being used as stoppers on soda water or pop bottles. His invention employed a wire spring attached to a rubber seal. Production of these stoppers was discontinued after 1912.

References

External links  
 Hutchinson Patent Stopper Guide 
 HBDHistoryAndPop

Seals (mechanical)
American inventions
Packaging